Red is a short dark thriller set in the underground world of illegal organ smuggling, the so-called red market. It's the directing debut of Branko Tomovic who is probably best known in the US for playing Jack Bauer's sidekick in the recent "24: Live Another Day" series and stars British actress Francesca Fowler (Doctor Who, Rome, Closure) with the acclaimed Irish actress Dervla Kirwan (Ondine, Ballykissangel, The Silence, Doctor Who) as the sadistic and cruel crime boss.

Synopsis
A damaged and guilt-ridden man who works in the underground world of illegal organ smuggling is looking for a way out.

Plot
Niklas, a surgeon who lives a life of solitude and is tormented by self-hatred, performs regular illegal surgeries for the red market. He works together with Mia, a young prostitute who lures her clients in and drugs them. Niklas is looking for a way out of this dark world, but owes his life to their violent crime boss Ed, who would rather kill him then let him go.

Cast
 Branko Tomovic as Niklas
 Francesca Fowler as Mia
 Dervla Kirwan as Ed

Awards
4th Kraljevski Filmski Festival, Serbia 2016 - Winner - Best Short Film
13th Maverick Movie Awards, Usa 2016 - Winner - Best Actor
4th Fort Worth Indie Film Showcase, Usa 2017 - Winner - Best International Short
8th Underground Cinema Awards, Ireland 2017 - Winner - Best International Film
2nd Unrestricted View Film Festival, Uk 2017 - Winner - Best Actor, Best Screenplay
3rd Flagship City International Film Festival, Usa 2017 - Winner - Best Actress
6th Carmarthen Bay Film Festival, Uk 2017 - Nominated - Best Short Film (Bafta Qualifying)
9th Naperville Independent Film Festival, Usa 2016 - Nominated - Best Short Film
5th Winchester Short Film Festival, Uk 2016 - Nominated - Best British Short Film
4th North Hollywood Cinefest, Usa 2017 - Nominated - Best Thriller Short
2nd Uk Screen One International Film Festival, Uk 2017 - Nominated - Best Short Film
1st Jim Thorpe Independent Film Festival, Usa 2017 - Nominated - Best Actor
3rd Flagship City International Film Festival, Usa 2017 - Nominated - Best Director, Best Short Film, Best Actor
13th Maverick Movie Awards, Usa 2016 - Nominated - Best Picture, Best Director, Best Actress, Best Supporting Actress, Best Ensemble Performance, Best Cinematography, Best Special Fx
4th Fort Worth Indie Film Showcase, Usa 2017 - Nominated - Best Genre Short
2nd Unrestricted View Film Festival, Uk 2017 - Nominated - Best Art Direction, Best Make Up/Costume
15th San Diego International Film Festival, Usa 2016 - Official Competition
22nd International Short Film Festival In Drama, Greece 2016 - Official Competition (European Film Award Qualifying)
8th Berlin Independent Film Festival, Germany 2017 - Official Competition
40th Grenzland-Filmtage Selb, Germany 2017 - Official Competition
9th Tangier International Film Festival, Morocco 2016 - Official Competition
11th Scenecs International Film Festival, Netherlands 2017 - Official Competition
7th Kaohsiung Film Festival, Taiwan 2017 - Official Competition
20th Long Island International Film Expo, Usa 2017 - Official Competition
7th Itsa Film Festival, Usa 2016 - Official Competition
17th International Izmir Short Film Festival, Turkey 2016 - Official Selection
1st Cardiff International Film Festival, Uk 2017 - Official Competition
32nd Wv International Film Festival, Usa 2017 - Official Selection
2nd Los Angeles Cinefest, Usa 2016 - Official Competition
4th Fly Film Festival, Usa 2017 - Official Competition
6th Showroom Shorts, Uk 2016 - Official Selection
3rd Nassau Film Festival, Usa 2017 - Official Competition
2nd Vault Film Festival, Uk 2017 - Official Selection

External links
 
 

2016 films
2010s thriller films
British independent films
British thriller films
2016 directorial debut films
2010s English-language films
2010s British films